Zurab Rurua (born 8 June 1987) is a Georgian water polo player for Dinamo Tbilisi and the Georgian national team.

He participated at the 2018 Men's European Water Polo Championship.

References

1987 births
Living people
Male water polo players from Georgia (country)